Samos 2 was an American reconnaissance satellite launched in 1961 as part of the Samos program. It was an early electro-optical reconnaissance spacecraft, meaning that it transmitted images to receiving stations on Earth rather than returning them in a film capsule. Samos 2 was a Samos-E1 spacecraft, based on an Agena-A.

The launch of Samos 2 occurred at 20:31:19 UTC on January 31, 1961. An Atlas LV-3A Agena-A rocket was used, flying from Launch Complex 1-1 at the Point Arguello Naval Air Station. Ten minutes and fourteen seconds later, the Agena's engine cut off, having successfully achieved a low Earth orbit. It was assigned the Harvard designation 1961 Alpha 1.

It operated successfully, but the images returned were poor. Designed to operate for around ten days, it ceased operations around a month after launch, and decayed from orbit on October 21, 1973.

References

Spacecraft launched in 1961
Spacecraft which reentered in 1973